Oldřich Nový (7 August 1899, in Prague – 15 March 1983, in Prague) was a Czech film and theatre actor, director, composer, dramaturg and singer. He is considered one of the greatest actors of the Czech cinema in the first half of the 20th century.

Biography 
His father Antonín Nový, a member of the Prague Fire Brigade, wanted him to become a typographer, but Oldřich showed passion for theatre from a young age. He was supported by his uncle Miloš Nový, a well-known actor of the National Theatre in Prague. In 1916 Nový became involved with the amateur theatre group "Řemeslnická beseda" and he also appeared in the popular cabaret "U labutě". A year later he performed in the "Varieté" in Karlín. In 1918 he was engaged in Ostrava and in 1919 he moved to Brno where he became the director of the operetta ensemble of the National Theatre. Nový remained in Brno for more than fifteen years and came back to Prague in 1935.

In 1935 he co-founded the "Nové divadlo" (The New Theatre) together with his wife Alice Valentová-Nová (née Alice Wienerová-Mahlerová). There he attempted to develop the "musical comedy" genre and to combine spoken word with traditional operetta style into a new and modern expression. His theatre was characterized as an "operetta for cultured people" (Eduard Bass). However, the first success only came after his film performances.

During the German occupation of Czechoslovakia Oldřich Nový became a target for the fascist press and was persecuted by Nazis. His wife was of Jewish origin and Nový refused to divorce her. As a consequence they were both imprisoned in the German concentration camp in Osterode in 1944. His wife was imprisoned probably in Theresienstadt, which she survived, unlike half of her family including her father. As a result of her trauma she developed schizophrenia.

In the second half of the 1940s the Czechoslovak theatres were nationalized and Nový "donated" his scene to the newly formed communist state. Operetta and the "musical comedy" were considered a bourgeois anachronism in that time and the communist régime banned also the film productions which weren't in compliance with the socialist realism. Following that he was deputed to lead the "Divadlo Umění lidu" in Prague-Karlín, together with Jan Werich. From 1950 to 1955 he has worked as a dramaturg of the "Czechoslovak film" and later was engaged as a director of the State Theatre in Karlín (1955–1960). In Karlín he finally managed to stage the classical operetta repertoire (Polish Blood, Orpheus in the Underworld, Die Fledermaus, Mamzelle Nitouche and Rose-Marie).

In the 1960s Nový also appeared on Czechoslovak television, where he performed in the popular TV series "Taková normální rodinka" (1967–1971). His last theatre role was a title character of the play "Hodinový hoteliér" by Pavel Landovský, directed by Evald Schorm.

In his later years Nový almost never left his flat, to avoid his fans and publicity.

Film career 
Oldřich Nový first appeared in the film Neznámá kráska in 1922. However, he began to perform in films more regularly only in the second half of the 1930s, following his return from Brno. At first he acted in somewhat trivial comedies, and his first promising performance was the small role of a reticent valet in the film adaptation of the play Velbloud uchem jehly by Hugo Haas and Otakar Vávra. In 1937 he met with renowned pre-war director Mac Frič. The two began their collaboration the same year, but their first success came in 1939, with the comedy Kristián. Nový appeared in the title role together with Adina Mandlová and Nataša Gollová. Kristián was a very successful film and Nový suddenly became a movie star in Czechoslovakia. In the next crazy comedy – Eva tropí hlouposti – Nový appeared together with Gollová. In both films, Nový portrayed two characters in one. In 1939 he acted together with Lída Baarová in the comedy Dívka v modrém.

Following World War II Nový starred in Parohy, directed by Alfréd Radok. In 1949 Mac Frič made a brilliant parody of pre-war kitsch films – Pytlákova schovanka aneb Šlechetný milionář. Nový appeared as millionaire René Skalský.

In the 1950s Nový also conformed with the new régime and occasionally appeared in the comedies influenced by socialist realism, such as Slovo dělá ženu (1952) and Hudba z Marsu (1955). These films are considered rather marginal in his filmography.

Joel Grey played Nový in Lars Van Trier's film Dancer in the Dark (2000).

Filmography
 Taková normální rodinka (1971) – as Jan Koníček
 Muž, který rozdával smích (1970)
 Světáci (Men about Town) (1969) – Professor
 Fantom Morrisvillu (The Phantom of Morrisville) (1966) – Drummer Emil/Sir Hannibal Morris
 Alibi na vodě (1965) – Photographer
 Káťa a krokodýl (Kathy and Crocodile) (1965) – Man with umbrella
 Dva z onoho světa (1962) – Pavel Fort/Petr Ford
 Bílá spona (1960) – Horák
 Kde alibi nestačí (1960) – Hotel director Kraus
 O věcech nadpřirozených (1958)
 Nechte to na mně (Leave It to Me) (1955) – Patočka
 Hudba z Marsu (Music from Mars) (1955) – Composer Jiří Karas
 Slovo dělá ženu (1952) – Ludvík Zach
 Pytlákova schovanka (The Poacher's Ward) (1949) – René Skalský
 Parohy (The Antlers) (1947) – Viktorin
 Jenom krok (Only a Step) (1945)
 Paklíč (1944) – Gabriel Anděl
 Sobota (de:Samstag ist kein Alltag) (1944) – Richard Herbert
 Valentin Dobrotivý (Valentin the Good) (1942) – Valentin Plavec
 Hotel Modrá hvězda (The Blue Star Hotel) (1941) – Vladimír Rychta Rohan
 Roztomilý člověk (A Charming Man) (1941) – Viktor Bláha
 Turbína (1941)
 Když Burian prášil / Baron Prášil (Baron Munchhausen) (1940) – Arnošt Benda
 Dívka v modrém (1940) – Notary Jan Karas
 Život je krásný (Life Is Beautiful) (1940) – Writer Jan Herold
 Přítelkyně pana ministra (The Minister's Girlfriends) (1940) – Jan Hrubý
 Dědečkem proti své vůli (The Reluctant Grandfather) (1939) – Richard Osten
 Eva tropí hlouposti (1939) – Michal Norr
 Kristián (Christian) (1939) – Alois Novák alias Kristián
 Třetí zvonění (The Third Ringing) (1938) – Dr Jan Hudec
 Advokátka Věra (Lawyer Vera) (1937) – Petr 'Tygr' Kučera
 Důvod k rozvodu (Grounds for Divorce) (1937) – Pavel Bertl
 Falešná kočička (The False Pussycat) (1937) – MUDr Vladimír Přelouč
 Na tý louce zelený (1936)
 Rozkošný příběh (Delightful Story) (1936) – Jaroslav Nerad
 Uličnice (Minx) (1936) – Antonio Morreti alias Josef Hřebík
 Velbloud uchem jehly (Camel Through the Eye of a Needle) (1936) – Valet Alfons
 Rozpustilá noc (1934) – Monokl Fredy
 Never the Twain (1926)
 Neznámá kráska (The Mysterious Beauty) (1922) – Petr Stamati

Songs
Kombiné něžné [CD]

Notes

References

External links 

Czechoslovak Movie Database 
Filmová databáze FDb CZ 
Encyclopedia of the City of Brno 
Gallery of Czechoslovak Actors – Oldřich Nový

1899 births
1983 deaths
Male actors from Prague
People from the Kingdom of Bohemia
Czech male film actors
Czech male silent film actors
20th-century Czech male actors
Czech male stage actors
Nazi concentration camp survivors